Blanchet Catholic School (BCS) is a private Catholic high school and middle school in Salem, Oregon, United States.  Blanchet's school colors are royal blue and white.

History
Blanchet was founded in 1995 after the tradition of two former Catholic secondary schools in Salem, Sacred Heart Academy (1863 to 1984) and Serra Catholic (1954 to 1969). It serves grades 7–12, and serves 6th grade as of Fall of 2009.  As of 2022, the school continues to offer enrollment of grades 6-12.

The school was named after Archbishop François Norbert Blanchet, the first Archbishop of the Oregon Territory. The school operates by permission of the Roman Catholic Archdiocese of Portland and is not owned by a religious institute.

Academic program
Blanchet has been accredited through Northwest Accreditation Commission since 1995.

Sports
Mid-High Sports
Mid-High sports at Blanchet include the following: Soccer (Coed,) Football, Track & Field, Volleyball (8th Grade,) Volleyball (6/7th grade,) Basketball (6/7/8th Grade,) Softball, and Baseball.

High School Sports
High school sports at Blanchet include: Cross Country (Varsity,) Football (JV & Varsity,) Volleyball (Girls JV2, JV, & Varsity,) Soccer (Boys Varsity,) Soccer (Girls Varsity,) Basketball (Boys JV, & Varsity,) Basketball (Girls JV & Varsity,) Swimming, Baseball (JV & Varsity,) Softball (Varsity,) Golf (Mens Varsity,) Golf (Girls Varsity,) and Track & Field (Varsity.)

Athletics
Blanchet Catholic School competes with other school teams in the PacWest Conference through the OSAA, (Oregon Schools Activities Assoc.)

References

External links
 www.blanchetcatholicschool.com

Roman Catholic Archdiocese of Portland in Oregon
Catholic secondary schools in Oregon
High schools in Salem, Oregon
Educational institutions established in 1995
Schools accredited by the Northwest Accreditation Commission
1995 establishments in Oregon